Henry Gannett (August 24, 1846 – November 5, 1914) was an American geographer who is described as the "father of mapmaking in America." He was the chief geographer for the United States Geological Survey essentially from its founding until 1902. He was also a founding member and president of the National Geographic Society.

Background
Gannett was born in Bath, Maine, son of Hannah Trufant (nee Church) and Michael Farley Gannett. He attended local schools, before going to Harvard for college. He graduated with a B.S. from the Lawrence Scientific School of Harvard University in 1869 and received an M.E. at the Hooper Mining School (aka the Harvard University School of Mining and Practical Geology) in 1870.

From 1870 to 1871, he was an assistant at the Harvard College Observatory. In 1871, he participated in a Harvard expedition to Spain to observe a solar eclipse.

In 1871 he declined a position as an astronomer with Charles Francis Hall's ill-fated Polaris Expedition to the North Pole. Instead, he accepted the position of topographer with Dr. Ferdinand Vandeveer Hayden's survey of  Yellowstone National Park, working on western territories surveys from 1872 through 1879. Gannett was trained in topographic mapping at Cambridge by Josiah D. Whitney and Charles F. Hoffman, who encouraged him to work with Hayden.

On July 26, 1872, while climbing the then-unnamed highest mountain in the Gallatin Mountains, he and his party experienced electric shocks following a lightning event near the summit. He was to name the mountain Electric Peak.

Career

In 1879, Gannet was among those lobbying to centralize the mapping functions into one government agency. Previously individual mapmakers and agencies had to compete for money from Congress for funds for projects. He suggested calling the new organization "United States Geological and Geographical Survey" although the name United States Geological Survey (USGS) would officially be approved. He also assisted in planning the work of the USGS.

Gannet was appointed to the USGS on October 8, 1879, under director Clarence King. He was immediately transferred served as the geographer of the 10th United States Census in1880. He laid out 2,000 enumeration districts with such precision that for the first time, each census enumerator knew in advance the metes and bounds of his particular district. The completion of this work on July 1, 1882, is considered the start of true topographical work in the United States and the birth of the quad. 

On July 1, 1882, John Wesley Powell appointed Gannett as the chief geographer in charge of the topographic mapping division of the USGS, a position he held until 1896. Around 1884, he persuaded various organizations doing the surveys, including the railroads, to begin using similar datums so the data could interconnect. As the chief geographer, he oversaw work on the topographical atlas of the United States. He also served as a geographer for the 11th Census in 1890 and the 12th Census in 1900.     

In 1890, he and Thomas Corwin Mendenhall of the U.S. National Geodetic Survey campaigned to establish the United States Board on Geographic Names to create official names for locations in the United States. He was named to the newly created Board on Geographic Names by President Benjamin Harrison in Executive Order No. 28. In 1896, his last year with the USGS, he started the use of the benchmark. 

In 1899, he was invited on the Harriman Alaska Expedition. In 1899, he was appointed the assistant director of the Census of the Philippines and Puerto Rico, the Philippines again in 1902, and Cuba in 1906. In 1909 he was named chairman of a special committee to examine and verify the records of Robert E. Peary in the controversy with Frederick Cook over who was the first to reach the North Pole.

Publications 

Gannett's published works are geographical and statistical. Although he did not public many works in geomorphology and physical geology, he offered valuable suggestions. For example, he recognized hanging valleys and their importance to interpreting a geological setting. He was issued a gazetteer for eleven states and was a contributor to Baedecker's Guide to the United States, Encyclopedia Britannica, and The New International Encyclopedia. Following are some Gannett's publications:
 The West with R. P. Porter and W. A. Jones (1882)

 Scribner's Statistical Atlas with F.W. Hewes (1883).
 "Dictionary of Altitudes in the United States." United States Geological Survey Bulletin No. 5(1884)
 "Dictionary of Altitudes in the United States. 2nd edition." United States Geological Survey Bulletin No. 70 (1884)
 ‘Boundaries of the United States and of the Several States and Territories, with a Historical Sketch of the Territorial Changes,” United States Geological Survey Bulletin No. 13 (1885)
 The Building of a Nation  (1893)
 A Manual of Topographic Methods. U.S. Geological Survey Monograph 22 (1893)

 A Manual of Topographic Surveying (1895)

 Commercial Geography with Garrison and Houston(1895)
 The United States (1898)
 Dictionary of Altitudes in the United States, 3rd edition (1899)
 Origin of Certain Place Names in the United States (1902) first compilation of place names for the United States
 A Gazetteer of Porto Rico (1901)
 A Gazetteer of Cuba (1902)
 Gazetteer of Texas1902)
 "The Forests of Oregon" USGS Professional Paper No. 4 (1902)
 "The Forests of Washington" USGS Professional Paper No. 5 (1902)
 A Dictionary of Altitudes in the United States (1906)
 List of the Mountains in the United States (1910-12)

Professional affiliations 
In 1888 Gannett was one of six founding members of the National Geographic Society. He served as its first secretary, and later as treasurer, then vice–president, and president, in 1909. He was also Chair of the Society's Research Committee, organizing expeditions to Alaska, La Soufriere, Mount Pelee, Peru, and the Polar Seas.

From 1897 to 1909, he was a vice president of the American Statistical Association. In 1904 he was among the founders of the American Association of Geographers. Also in 1904, he was secretary of the 8th Geographic Congress. He was also a member of the Washington Academy of Sciences, the Royal Geographical Society of London, the Royal Scottish Geographical Society, the Philadelphia Geographic Society, and one of ten founding members and president of the Cosmos Club.

Gannett was a co-founder and president of the Twenty Year Club or Twenty Year Topographers which was formed at the U.S.G.S. Topographic Division in the winter of 1910-1911. Eligibility was serving twenty years or more as a topographer with the U.S.G.S.

Honors 
Gannett received an honorary LL.D from Bowdoin College in 1889.

Gannett Peak, the highest peak in Wyoming, and the related Gannett Glacier was named for him in 1906. In 1911, Lawrence Martin named Mount Gannett, a 10,000-foot peak in the Chugach Mountains of eastern Alaska, for Henry Gannett.

Personal 
He married Mary E. Chase of Waterville, Maine on November 24, 1874. They had a son, Farley Gannett who was an engineer for the Water Supply Commission of Pennsylvania. Their daughters were May Gannett (Mrs. G. T. Backus) and Alice Gannett.

He died at his home in 1840 Biltmore Street, Washington, D.C. on November 5, 1914, after being ill for about a year with Bright's Disease. HIs funeral service was given by Rev. U. G. B. Pierce of All Soul's Unitarian Church. The day of his funeral, the National Geographic Society closed its offices and draped the building in mourning.

References

External links

 
 

1846 births
1914 deaths
People from Bath, Maine
American information and reference writers
American instructional writers
Harvard University alumni
American geographers
United States Geological Survey personnel
National Geographic Society founders
American topographers
19th-century non-fiction writers
Deaths from nephritis
American Unitarians